Rupert John Cornford (27 December 1915 – 28 December 1936) was an English poet and communist. During the first year of the Spanish Civil War, he was a member of the POUM militia and later the International Brigades. He died while fighting against the Nationalists, at Lopera, near Córdoba.

Biography 

Cornford was the son of Francis Cornford and Frances Cornford (née Darwin), and was a great-grandson of Charles Darwin and Emma Darwin. He was born in Cambridge, and named after Rupert Brooke, who was a friend of his parents, but preferred to use his second name.  He was educated at King's College School, Cambridge, Stowe School and Trinity College, Cambridge. He began writing poetry at the age of fourteen, strongly influenced by Robert Graves and W. H. Auden, and as a schoolboy argued fiercely about poetry with his mother, a member of the more sedate "Georgian" group whose most famous representative was A. E. Housman. He spent a year in London studying at the London School of Economics and becoming a speaker and organiser for the Young Communists. At Cambridge as an undergraduate, reading history, he joined the Communist Party of Great Britain. He was two or three years younger than the group of Trinity College communists including Guy Burgess, Donald Maclean, Kim Philby and James Klugmann.

Another Cambridge student, who would play a major part in his life, was Margot Heinemann, a fellow Communist. They were lovers and he addressed poems and letters to her. He had previously been in a relationship with a Welsh woman, Rachel (Ray) Peters, with whom he had a child, James Cornford, later adopted by John's parents.  A photograph of Peters and Cornford can be found at the National Portrait Gallery, London.

From 1933 he was directly involved in Communist Party work in London, and became associated with Harry Pollitt, the General Secretary of the CPGB. 

In August 1936, shortly after the start of the Spanish Civil War, he travelled to Barcelona and joined the POUM militia, serving briefly on the Aragon front where he wrote his three most famous poems including the often-reprinted "To Margot Heinemann" (originally simply entitled Poem). The following month he returned to England, where he recruited twenty-one British volunteers, including Bernard Knox, John Sommerfield, Chris Thorneycroft and Griffin Maclaurin. With this group he travelled to Paris and then on to Albacete, where they joined the International Brigades—the nucleus of what would become the British Section. He served with a machine-gun unit of the Commune de Paris Battalion, and fought alongside a number of other British volunteers in the defence of Madrid through November and December 1936, including Esmond Romilly. Having transferred to the recently formed British Battalion, he was killed in uncertain circumstances at Lopera, near Córdoba.

Legacy 
A memorial volume to Cornford was published in 1938. As Stephen Spender observed in his review of the book, "Cornford's life speaks for itself in a way that burns the imagination ... The fact that Cornford lived and that others like him still live, is an important lesson to the leaders of democracies. It shows that people will live and die and fight for democracy if it gives them the justice and freedom which are worth fighting for."

Cornford's poem Full Moon At Tierz (1937) is a literary expression of the anti-fascist cause. It has been said of Cornford, specifically in relation to this poem, that as a poet he was not a modernist. One justification for this claim is the following passage from George Orwell's 1940 essay "My Country Right or Left":

Far from being dismissive, this is actually approving. Orwell is claiming that emotions like school spirit and patriotism—deep allegiances—can shift from one cause to another, from conservatism to revolution, and be just as sincere. However, Cornford was never a conventional public-school boy. He attended Stowe, a new and very liberal school, only from August 1929 to January 1933—hardly more than three years. By the middle of his seventeenth year he was living in London, attending the London School of Economics, and was a committed Communist organiser and speaker.
 
British critic Stan Smith, in his essay "'Hard As the Metal of My Gun': John Cornford's Spain", undertakes a detailed reading of "Full Moon at Tierz" that brings out its complexity and ambivalence. The poem begins with a Marxist and modernist vision of history as a mountain glacier where "[t]ime was inches, dark was all" until it reaches "[t]he dialectic's point of change" and "crashes in light and minutes to its fall." Now "Time present is a cataract whose force Breaks down the banks even at its source… And we must swing it to its final course." Certainly, despite its far wider focus and dense philosophical imagery, the poem so far is, like Newbolt's, an expression of determination, as the final stanza of this section shows:

While "Time future, has no image in space"—it doesn't yet exist—Cornford asserts that "We are the future." But the future is also both "crooked" and "straight": that is, the fight is straightforward, but the road to the future he and his comrades embody is crooked, winding, uncertain.

The second part of the poem is a complex and highly referential reflection on the then-recent history of the Communist movement. Cornford believes that the new policies of the Communist International (about which Smith argues, he has serious doubts) will be tested in practice:

 
(Oviedo is a city in Northern Spain where miners had already taken up arms against the dictatorship that preceded the Second Spanish Republic; the Mauser is a type of rifle.)

In the third section, Cornford confronts his own isolation. Smith discusses what he calls "the paradoxical fusion of solidarity and solitude in a single line at the heart of 'Full Moon at Tierz': 'Now with my Party, I stand quite alone'. In the midst of all this enforced solidarity, it is the loneliness which persists."  Smith goes on: "A hesitant and solitary being wills himself, in a kind of prayer to an absent Marxian deity, not to lose his faith, to be a good Communist":

The raw, even violent emotional honesty of these lines is both very modern—one cannot imagine a poet before about 1920 writing them—and very characteristic of Cornford's mature poetry.

His best-known poem, usually titled (after Cornford's death) "To Margot Heinemann," partakes of the same emotional directness, but in a more tender vein. The poem has been described by the poet Carol Rumens as "one of the most moving and memorable 20th-century love poems". While the form is in some respects traditional—ballad-form quatrains rhyming abcb—its rhythms are skillfully irregular, with two to three stresses per line, and its rhymes often slant, including those of the moving last stanza: "And if bad luck should lay my strength Into the shallow grave, Remember all the good you can; Don't forget my love." Rumens says: "You feel as if you have been presented with a photograph of a young soldier's inner life. He is a passionate lover and a passionate warrior: these qualities are held in perfect psychic balance. And they are timeless. The speaker could be one of Homer's heroes. He could be a Spartan at Thermopylae." But the famous opening lines "Heart of the heartless world, / Dear heart, the thought of you" actually contain a blind quotation from Marx, who in the Introduction to his Critique of Hegel's Philosophy of Right describes religion as "the heart of a heartless world."

In his 1942 introduction to The Fury of the Living, a collection of poems by John Singer, Hugh MacDiarmid calls Cornford (along with Christopher Caudwell, another young writer killed fighting in Spain), one of the 'few inspiring exceptions' from the 'leftist poets of the comfortable classes'.

His brother Christopher Cornford continued to be active in politics until into the late 1980s, in the Campaign for Nuclear Disarmament and its offshoot Cambridge Against Missile Bases, and in the environmental movement as a signatory of the Blueprint for Survival and an early member of the Ecology (later Green) Party in the UK.

John's son, James (1934–2011), who was two years old when John was killed in action, became an academic and social reformer. He led a variety of organizations, including the Nuffield Foundation, the Campaign for Freedom of Information (1984–1997), the Paul Hamlyn Foundation, and the first director of the Institute for Public Policy Research, as well as a literary editor and later chairman of The Political Quarterly academic journal. He served as an advisor to David Clark, but when Clark's advocacy for a strong freedom of information law was rejected by cabinet, Clark resigned along with Cornford. James Cornford was survived by four children and his wife.

Th character of Tommy Judd in the 1981 award-winning play Another Country by Julian Mitchell was based on Cornford."

Works

References

Sources 
 
  (Republished 1978 by Borderline Press )

Further reading

External links 
 
 Great Lives: Series 19 John Cornford
 "Saint John" By T.R. Healy

1915 births
1936 deaths
People educated at Stowe School
British people of the Spanish Civil War
English communists
Communist Party of Great Britain members
English anti-fascists
Military personnel killed in the Spanish Civil War
Alumni of Trinity College, Cambridge
International Brigades personnel
Darwin–Wedgwood family
20th-century English poets
English male poets
Communist poets